Pishelville is an unincorporated community in Knox County, Nebraska, United States.

History
A post office was established at Pishelville in 1874, and remained in operation until it was discontinued in 1927. The town was founded by Anton Pischel, and named for him.

References

Unincorporated communities in Knox County, Nebraska
Unincorporated communities in Nebraska